Otto Schnitzer (8 January 1890 – 16 May 1975) was a German sculptor. His work was part of the sculpture event in the art competition at the 1932 Summer Olympics.

References

1890 births
1975 deaths
20th-century German sculptors
20th-century German male artists
German male sculptors
Olympic competitors in art competitions
People from Göppingen (district)